The Westfield Public Schools is  a comprehensive community public school district that serves students in pre-kindergarten through twelfth grade from Westfield, in Union County, New Jersey, United States.

As of the 2018–19 school year, the district, comprised of 10 schools, had an enrollment of 6,304 students and 500.4 classroom teachers (on an FTE basis), for a student–teacher ratio of 12.6:1.

The district is classified by the New Jersey Department of Education as being in District Factor Group "I", the second-highest of eight groupings. District Factor Groups organize districts statewide to allow comparison by common socioeconomic characteristics of the local districts. From lowest socioeconomic status to highest, the categories are A, B, CD, DE, FG, GH, I and J.

Awards and recognition
Theodore Roosevelt Intermediate School was awarded the National Blue Ribbon School Award of Excellence by the United States Department of Education, the highest award an American school can receive, during the 2004-05 school year. Washington Elementary School was honored by the National Blue Ribbon Schools Program in 2019, one of nine schools in the state recognized as Exemplary High Performing Schools.

For the 1994-95 school year, Westfield High School was named as a "Star School" by the New Jersey Department of Education, the highest honor that a New Jersey school can achieve.

Schools 
The district has a central kindergarten, six neighborhood elementary schools (grades 1-5), two middle schools (grades 6-8) divided by a "North Side / South Side" boundary, and one high school (grades 9-12). The schools in the district (with 2018–19 enrollment data from the National Center for Education Statistics) are:
Early childhood
Lincoln Early Childhood Center (with 310 students; in grades PreK-K)
Audrey Zavetz, Principal
Elementary schools
Franklin Elementary School (580; 1-5 - North)
Eileen Cambria, Principal
Jefferson Elementary School (442; 1-5 - South)
Susie Hung, Principal
McKinley Elementary School (341; 1-5 -  South)
Marc Biunno, Principal
Tamaques Elementary School (401; 1-5 - South)
David Duelks, Principal
Washington Elementary School (309; 1-5 - North)
Andrew Perry, Principal
Wilson Elementary School (355; 1-5 - North)
Crystal Marsh, Principal
Intermediate schools
Roosevelt Intermediate School (777; 6-8 - North)
Brian Gechtman, Principal
Thomas Alva Edison Intermediate School (844; 6-8 - South)
Matt Bolton, Principal
High school
Westfield High School (1,865; 9-12)
Mary Asfendis, Principal

Public school students are also eligible to apply to attend the Union County Vocational Technical Schools, which include Union County Magnet High School, Union County Academy for Information Technology, Union County Academy for Allied Health Sciences, Union County Vocational Technical High School and Union County Academy for Performing Arts.

Press
Westfield High School publishes a weekly student newspaper during the school year called Hi's Eye. Established in 1935, the paper publishes 33 issues per year with a monthly Arts and Entertainment insert called Iris.  The Hi's Eye is unique among many student run newspapers in that it is weekly and completely self-funded. The motto for the Hi's Eye is "For the students, by the students, since 1935."

The middle schools and elementary schools also publish a brief newspaper written by their students, for their students. Theodore Roosevelt Intermediate School publishes an issue of The Rough Rider 12 times a year. Thomas Alva Edison Intermediate School publishes The Edison Insider a few times a year. Woodrow Wilson Elementary School publishes an issue of The Wilson World twice a year.

Administration
Core members of the district's administration are:
Dr. Raymond A. González, Superintendent
Dana Sullivan, Business Administrator / Board Secretary

Board of education
The district's board of education, comprised of nine members, sets policy and oversees the fiscal and educational operation of the district through its administration. As a Type II school district, the board's trustees are elected directly by voters to serve three-year terms of office on a staggered basis, with three seats up for election each year held (since 2012) as part of the November general election. The board appoints a superintendent to oversee the day-to-day operation of the district.

References

External links
Westfield Public Schools

School Data for the Westfield Public Schools, National Center for Education Statistics

Westfield, New Jersey
New Jersey District Factor Group DE
School districts in Union County, New Jersey